Martin Stewart Meeson (6 November 1933 – 12 July 1995) was an English first-class cricketer.

Meeson was born at Marylebone in November 1933. He was educated at Bedford School, before going up to Pembroke College, Cambridge. While studying at Cambridge, he made a single appearance in first-class cricket for Cambridge University against Kent at Fenner's in 1957. Batting twice in the match, he was dismissed in the Cambridge first-innings for 21 runs by John Pretlove, while in their second-innings he was dismissed for 4 runs by Colin Page. In addition to playing first-class cricket, he also played minor counties cricket for Bedfordshire from 1952–63, albeit intermittently, making nine appearances in the Minor Counties Championship. Meeson died at Westminster in July 1995.

References

External links

1933 births
1995 deaths
People from Marylebone
People educated at Bedford School
Alumni of Pembroke College, Cambridge
English cricketers
Bedfordshire cricketers
Oxford University cricketers